"I Will Remember You" is a song written by Sarah McLachlan, Séamus Egan and Dave Merenda. The original inspiration came from Seamus Egan's instrumental song, "Weep Not for the Memories", which appeared on his album A Week in January (1990). McLachlan and Merenda added lyrics and modified the melody for her version. The song first appeared on the soundtrack for the movie The Brothers McMullen in 1995 and was released the same year, when it peaked at number 65 on the US Billboard Hot 100 and number 10 in Canada. It was also featured on McLachlan's 1996 remix album, Rarities, B-Sides and Other Stuff. The Rarities version of the song has three verses, the first of which is omitted during live performances, as heard on her 1999 album Mirrorball.

In 1999 McLachlan released the live version of the song from Mirrorball; this release peaked at number 14 in the United States on July 20, 1999, and number 10 in Canada on July 26, topping the country's adult contemporary chart on August 16 and August 23. The live version went Gold in the United States and earned McLachlan her second Grammy Award for Best Female Pop Vocal Performance in 2000 (after winning for "Building a Mystery" in 1998 and being nominated for "Adia" in 1999). McLachlan performed the song during an "in memoriam" slide show at the 61st Primetime Emmy Awards, held on September 20, 2009.

Critical reception
Billboard reviewer Brett Atwood praised the vocal delivery on the studio version along with the "detailed" guitar and piano lines. Steve Baltin from Cash Box picked it as a Pick of the Week, writing, "McLachlan’s contribution to the soundtrack of The Brothers McMullen is as good a ballad as will be released this year. Against an alternately sparse and lush arrangement, the Canadian with the voice of an angel beautifully asks the age-old question, “will you remember me when all is said and done?” Reminiscent of her hit from last year, “Good Enough”, this song further establishes McLachlan as one of the most gifted singers in pop/rock. As the film’s success continues to grow, look for this song to be a smash at Adult Contemporary and to eventually cross over to CHR and Top 40. If this one doesn’t move you, you’ve never been in love."

Chart performance
On the week ending January 20, 1996, the original recording of the song peaked at number 54 on the Billboard Hot 100 Single Sales chart and number 65 on Hot 100 Singles chart.
The live rerecording of the song peaked at number two on the Adult Top 40 chart in July and August 1999 and number three on the Adult Contemporary chart in August and September 1999.
On the week ending July 31, 1999, it peaked at number fourteen on the Hot 100 chart and number seven at the Hot 100 Airplay chart.

The song has sold more than two million copies worldwide as of February 2000.

Charts

Weekly charts

Year-end charts

Certifications

Covers
This song was covered by Kenny Rogers on his 1999 album, She Rides Wild Horses.

Séamus Egan's band Solas included a version of the song on their 2000 album The Hour Before Dawn.

Andy Bernard sings an acoustic version of the song on the ninth-season episode of The Office entitled "Livin' the Dream".

This song opened the series finale of Melrose Place "Ashes to Ashes" in 1999.

Christina Aguilera performed a cover version of the song in the Amazon Prime Video's comedy special Yearly Departed, which first aired in December 2020.

References

1995 singles
1996 singles
1999 singles
Music videos directed by Sophie Muller
Sarah McLachlan songs
Pop ballads
Arista Records singles
Songs written by Sarah McLachlan
1995 songs
1990s ballads
Grammy Award for Best Female Pop Vocal Performance